William Franklin Guest (July 2, 1941 – December 24, 2015) was an American R&B/soul singer best known as a member of Gladys Knight & the Pips along with his cousins Gladys Knight, Merald "Bubba" Knight and Edward Patten.  Guest was a member of the group for its entire history from 1952 to 1989.  He is a multiple Grammy Award winner and was inducted to the Rock and Roll Hall of Fame with Gladys Knight & the Pips in 1996.

Biography
Guest was born in Atlanta, Georgia, in 1941.  He was an original member of Gladys Knight & the Pips along with his sister Eleanor Guest and cousins Brenda, Gladys and Merald "Bubba" Knight.  Guest had occasional lead recordings during the group's long career, including the 1964 B-side "Maybe Maybe Baby" to their original recording of "Giving Up" and "Window Raisin' Granny" from their 1973 hit album Imagination.  "Window Raisin' Granny" was sampled by LL Cool J and Christina Aguilera among others.  Following his stint with The Pips, Guest and fellow Pip Edward Patten formed Patten and Guest Productions, and following Patten's death in 2005, he continued to manage artists through the Crew Entertainment company he formed with members of Patten's family.

Guest died on December 24, 2015, of congestive heart failure in Detroit, Michigan, his home for fifty years. He was 74 years old.

Awards
Guest was inducted to the Rock and Roll Hall of Fame with Gladys Knight & the Pips in 1996.

Bibliography

References

External links

1941 births
2015 deaths
20th-century African-American male singers
21st-century African-American people
American male dancers
American male singers
American rhythm and blues singers
American soul musicians
American soul singers
Burials at South-View Cemetery
Gladys Knight & the Pips members
Knight family (show business)
Musicians from Atlanta
Musicians from Detroit